Foggy usually describes a state of fog. It may also refer to:

People
Carl Fogarty, British four-time World Superbike Champion nicknamed "Foggy"
Foggy Lyttle, British guitarist
Seymour Mullings, Jamaican politician nicknamed "Foggy"

Fictional characters
Foggy Nelson, a fictional character supporting Marvel Comics' Daredevil

See also
 Foggie (disambiguation)
 Fog (disambiguation)